Stanley Edward Lane-Poole (18 December 1854 – 29 December 1931) was a British orientalist and archaeologist. Poole was from a famous orientalist family as his paternal grandmother Sophia Lane Poole, uncle Reginald Stuart Poole and great-uncle Edward William Lane were famous for their work in this field. His other great-uncle was Richard James Lane, a distinguished Victorian lithographer and engraver.

Biography

Born in London, England, from 1874 to 1892 he worked in the British Museum, and after that in Egypt researching on Egyptian archaeology. From 1897 to 1904 he had a chair as Professor of Arabic studies at Dublin University.

He was married to Charlotte Bell Wilson from 1879 until her death in 1905. The couple had three sons and a daughter; his eldest son predeceased him while of his other two sons, Richard was a Royal Navy officer and Charles was a forester who did much work in Australia.

Bibliography

Books
 Completed the First Book of the Arabic-English Lexicon, left unfinished by his uncle, E. W. Lane.
 Coins of the Urtuki Turkumans, International Numismata Orientalia, part 2 1875
The Life of Edward William Lane (1877)
The People of Turkey (editor) (1878) 
Lane's Selection From the Kuran (1879)
Egypt (1881)
Le Korân, sa poésie et ses lois (1882)
Studies in a Mosque (Cairo, February 1883)
Picturesque Palestine, Sinai and Egypt, D. Appleton: New York (1883)
Social Life in Egypt: A Description of the Country & Its People (1884)
The Life of the late General F.R. Chesney (editor) (1885)
The Story of the Moors in Spain (1886)
Turkey (1888)
 
Sir Richard Church (1890)
The Speeches and Table-Talk of the Prophet Mohammad (1893)
The Mohammedan Dynasties: Chronological and Genealogical Tables with Historical Introductions (1894)

Babar, Rulers of India series (1899)
History of Egypt in the Middle Ages (1901)
Medieval India under Mohammedan Rule, AD 712-1764 (1903)
Saladin and the Fall of the Kingdom of Jerusalem (1903)
The Story of Cairo (1906)

Life of Sir Harry Parkes with F.V. Dickins (1894)

Articles
 Approximately 72 entries (up to 1901) in Dictionary of National Biography
 
Introduction to 1913 edition of Richard Francis Burton (1856), Personal Narrative of a Pilgrimage to Al Madinah and Meccah , 3 volumes.

Edited

References

External links

 
 
 

1854 births
1931 deaths
Artists' Rifles soldiers
British Arabists
British Egyptologists
British Indologists
British lexicographers
British numismatists
British orientalists
Employees of the British Museum
Historians of the Middle East
Lane family